The Women is a 2008 American comedy-drama film written, produced and directed by Diane English and starring Meg Ryan, Annette Bening, Eva Mendes, Debra Messing, Jada Pinkett Smith, Carrie Fisher, Cloris Leachman, Debi Mazar, Bette Midler, and Candice Bergen. The screenplay is an updated version of the George Cukor-directed 1939 film of the same name based on a 1936 play by Clare Boothe Luce.

Though a commercial success, The Women was panned by critics.

Plot
Clothing designer Mary Haines lives in a beautiful suburban Connecticut home with her wealthy financier husband Stephen and their 11-year-old daughter Molly. Her best friend since college, Sylvie Fowler, is the editor of a prominent fashion magazine that dictates the latest in taste and style for New York City fashionistas. When Sylvie learns Stephen is having an affair with Crystal Allen, a perfume salesgirl in Saks Fifth Avenue, from chatty manicurist Tanya, she confides in the ever-pregnant Edie Cohen but hesitates to tell Mary, who discovers the news from the same woman after getting a manicure herself. Despite her mother Catherine's exhortation to keep quiet about what she knows, Mary confronts Crystal first, in a lingerie store, and then Steven, before asking for a divorce.

Sylvie, Edie, and writer Alex Fisher join forces to support their spurned friend, but complications arise when Sylvie, facing the loss of her job, conspires with local gossip columnist Bailey Smith by confirming Mary's marital woes in exchange for Bailey contributing a celebrity profile to the magazine. Mary is stunned by Sylvie's betrayal and ends their friendship. Mary's daughter begins to ditch school and confides in Sylvie because her mother, distracted by the upheavals in her once idyllic life, becomes more distant.

Mary is fired from her job by her father, has a makeover, and decides to open her own clothing design firm with some financial assistance from Catherine. As she begins to get her life in order, she makes an effort to bond with Molly, who reveals her father's relationship with Crystal is unraveling and reunites with Sylvie, who has quit her job. With this knowledge in hand, Mary sets out to repair her fractured marriage as she prepares to unveil her new line of womenswear in a fashion show attended not only by boutique owners but the buyer from Saks as well.

Sylvie tells Mary that she has met a guy and is thinking of giving him her real phone number. Edie's water breaks and she has a baby boy. Mary receives a call from her husband and is encouraged by the others to answer it; she then arranges a date with him. In the end, we see that a magazine titled Sylvie is published with the four friends on the cover and Alex's book is out. A hint is given about Crystal's possibly going out with Alex's ex-girlfriend Natasha. The women talk about the magazine, the book, and the joys, heartaches, and uniquely special triumphs of being a woman.

Cast

Production

In The Women: The Legacy, a bonus feature on the DVD release of the film, Diane English discusses her fifteen-year-long struggle to bring a contemporary version of the 1939 classic film to the screen. She wanted to present a version in which the female characters were strong and self-reliant and supported and defended each other rather than resort to treachery and catty remarks to achieve their goals. Since the concept of women going to Reno in search of a divorce is archaic, she needed to eliminate this aspect of the original plot from her treatment, which necessitated deleting several characters from the story. One character that is not in its original form is Lucy, who in the play and original movie runs the ranch in Reno, here she is seen as Mary's dog.

English wrote the first screenplay in 1993 during hiatus from Murphy Brown. The following year, Julia Roberts and Meg Ryan agreed to co-produce and star, with James L. Brooks as director and a supporting cast including Blythe Danner, Marisa Tomei, Debi Mazar, and Candice Bergen. In 1996, the first table reading of the script was held at Sony Pictures. Despite the enthusiasm of everyone involved, the project stalled when Roberts and Ryan decided they wanted to play the same role.

English spent the following year revising the screenplay, during which time Brooks dropped out to direct As Good as It Gets. Roberts also lost interest and moved on. English first entertained the idea of directing the film herself in 2001. Over the next few years, Sandra Bullock, Ashley Judd, Uma Thurman, Whitney Houston, and Queen Latifah were among those to express interest, although none were attached officially.

After being turned down by every major Hollywood studio, English decided to develop the project as an independent film and approached Victoria Pearman, the president of Mick Jagger's production company, Jagged Films, who agreed to produce the film for Picturehouse. Pearman offered some plot suggestions, and English put the finishing touches on the seventh and final draft of the script. Upon the film's completion, it was shown to executives at Warner Bros., which had absorbed Picturehouse in the interim. Unimpressed, they put the film on the back burner until the box office success of Sex and the City convinced them there was an audience for an all-female film.

The film was shot on location in New York City and various cities in Massachusetts. As with the play and 1939 film, English was careful to make sure no men appear on screen, even in long shots and crowd scenes. The only male character in the film is Edie's baby boy, born in the final scene of the film.

Critical reception
The film received a significant negative response from critics. It holds a 14% approval rating on Rotten Tomatoes based on 148 reviews, with an average rating of 3.9/10. The critical consensus states: "The Women is a toothless remake of the 1939 classic, lacking the charm, wit and compelling protagonists of the original."

Roger Ebert of the Chicago Sun-Times was one of the few critics who enjoyed the film. He awarded it three out of four stars and commented,

A.O. Scott of The New York Times called the film "a witless, straining mess" and added,

Kenneth Turan of the Los Angeles Times observed,

David Wiegand of the San Francisco Chronicle wrote,

Peter Travers of Rolling Stone rated the film one out of four stars, calling it a "misbegotten redo" and "a major dud." He added, "Everyone...struggles with a script that resists being crowbarred into the 21st century." Richard Schickel of Time called the film "one of the worst movies I've ever seen."

Meg Ryan, Annette Bening, Eva Mendes, Debra Messing and Jada Pinkett Smith each garnered a Razzie Award nomination for Worst Actress.

Box office
Despite the mostly negative reviews, the film was a moderate box office success. On its opening weekend, the film earned $10,115,210, ranking fourth behind Righteous Kill, The Family That Preys, and Burn After Reading. The film eventually grossed $26,902,075 in the U.S. and $23,105,471 in foreign markets for a total worldwide box office of $50,007,546.

Home media
The film was released on DVD on December 19, 2008 in the U.S. and 19 March 2009 in the UK.

References

External links
 
 
 
 
 
 
 The Women Past and Present at LaFemmeReel.com 

2008 films
2008 comedy-drama films
2008 directorial debut films
2008 LGBT-related films
2000s American films
2000s buddy comedy-drama films
2000s English-language films
2000s female buddy films
2000s pregnancy films
American buddy comedy-drama films
American female buddy films
American LGBT-related films
American pregnancy films
Comedy film remakes
Drama film remakes
Films about adultery in the United States
Films based on adaptations
Films featuring an all-female cast
Films produced by Mick Jagger
Films set in Connecticut
Films set in New York City
Films shot in Boston
Films shot in New York City
Lesbian-related films
LGBT-related buddy comedy-drama films
New Line Cinema films
Picturehouse films
Remakes of American films